Skjønhaug is a village in the municipality of Trøgstad, Norway. Its official population, as of 2005, was 1,817.

Villages in Østfold
Trøgstad